Brabec (feminine Brabcová) is a Czech surname meaning "sparrow". It is sometimes Germanized as Brabetz. The surname may refer to:

 Antonín Brabec (canoeist) (born 1946), Czechoslovak slalom canoeist 
 Christina Brabetz (born 1993), South African-German violinist
 Erich Brabec (born 1977), Czech professional football player
 Felicia Brabec (born  1974), American politician and clinical psychologist
 Jakub Brabec (born 1992), Czech professional football player
 Richard Brabec (born 1966), Czech politician
 Ricky Brabec (born 1991), American motorcycle racer
 Vladimír Brabec (1934–2017), Czech actor
 Zuzana Brabcová (1959–2015), Czech writer

See also
 

Czech-language surnames
Surnames from nicknames